Ka. Naa. Subramanyam (31 January 1912 – 18 December 1988) was a Tamil writer and critic from Tamil Nadu, India. He is also popularly known by his Tamil initials as Ka. Naa. Su.

Biography
Subramanian was born on 31 January 1912 in  Valangaiman in Thanjavur District. His first noted published work was the novel Poithevu (1946). He also wrote poems under the pseudonym Mayan. He published many literary journals like Ilakkiya vattam, Sooravali and Chandraodayam. He became a literary critic in the 1950s, publishing reviews first in the magazines Swadesamitran and Saraswathi. He was a friend and contemporary of fellow literary critic C. S. Chellappa with whom he was involved in a long literary feud. He was considered as a right-winger and Anti-Marxist by left-leaning Tamil writers. In 1965, he moved to New Delhi and started writing articles for English-language newspapers. For the next twenty years he lived in Delhi and moved back to Chennai only in 1985. In 1986, he was awarded the Sahitya Akademi Award for Tamil for his literary criticism Ilakkiyathukku oru Iyakkam (lit. A Movement for Literature). After his return to Chennai, he started writing for Tamil magazines like Kungumam, Mutharam, Dina mani Kathir and Thuglak. Pondicherry University made him an honorary professor. He died in 1988. The Government of Tamil Nadu nationalised his works in 2006.

Awards and recognitions
Sahitya Akademi Award for Ilakkiyathukku oru Iyakkam	(Literary criticism) (1986)
Government of Tamil Nadu award for the short story Kodhai Sirithaal
Kumaran Asan award

Partial bibliography

Novels
Sarmavin uyil
Pasi
Vaazhvum thaazhvum
Sakthi vilasam
Ezhu per
Oru naal
Puzhithi ther
Maalthedi
Nadutheru
Gopuravaasal
Poithevu
Asurakanam
Pithappoo
Kothai Sirithall

Short story collections
Manikoondu
Adarangu
Karugadha mottu
Kannan En Thozhan

Literary criticism
Vimarsana kalai
Padithirukireergala
Ulagathu sirandha novelgal
Ilakkiya Visaaram

Translations
Anbuvazhi
Thabaal kaaran
Madhaguru
Nilavalam
Vilangupannai (Animal Farm)
Devamalar
kaali

English books
Tiruvalluvar and his Tirukkural

References

1912 births
Writers from Tamil Nadu
Recipients of the Sahitya Akademi Award in Tamil
Tamil writers
1988 deaths
Indian Tamil people
20th-century Indian translators
20th-century Indian short story writers
Indian literary critics
20th-century Indian novelists
People from Thanjavur district